The 2019 League of Ireland season was Bohemian Football Club's 129th year in their history and their 35th consecutive season in the League of Ireland Premier Division since it became the top tier of Irish football. Bohemians participated in various domestic cups this season, including the FAI Cup, EA Sports Cup and the Leinster Senior Cup. Bohemians also competed in the Scottish Challenge Cup.

On 19 December 2018 the fixtures were announced with Bohs down to play newly promoted Finn Harps on the opening day of the season.

Bohemians successfully sold out their home ticket allocation for the first eight matches of the season with average crowds at Dalymount Park up exponentially on seasons prior. They would go on to sell out the Jodi stand five more times in Dalymount, including a capacity crowd for a mid-season friendly against Chelsea, bringing the total number of sell outs up to fourteen.

Bohemians secured European football for the first time in seven years on the penultimate day of the season and would finish in third place. The club advanced to the semi final stage of all three domestic cup competitions. Bohs long-serving captain Derek Pender retired on the last day of the season against Sligo Rovers and marked the occasion with a goal from the penalty spot.

Club

Kits
The club’s traditional red and black stripes were provided by O'Neills this season. The deal with previous kit manufacturer Hummel ended after the 2018 campaign.

Bohemians away jersey for the 2019 campaign sparked international media attention, as it paid tribute to one of the most famous musicians to have played at Dalymount Park - Bob Marley. Due to image rights issues, Bohemians were forced to remove the singer’s face from the jersey. The redesign showed a clenched fist as "a symbol of solidarity and support used to express unity, strength and resistance".

Supplier: O'Neills / Sponsor: Mr Green

Management team

Squad

Transfers

In

Loan in

Out

Loan out

Statistics

Appearances and goals
Number in brackets represents appearances of which were substituted ON.

Top scorers 
Includes all competitive matches.
Last updated 26 October 2019

Hat tricks 
Includes all competitive matches.
Last updated 26 October 2019

(H) – Home ; (A) – Away

Clean sheets 
Includes all competitive matches.
Last updated 26 October 2019

Disciplinary record 

Includes all competitive matches. Last updated 26 October 2019

Captains

Competitions

Overview

{|class="wikitable" style="text-align:left"
|-
!rowspan=2 style="width:140px;"|Competition
!colspan=8|Record
|-
!style="width:40px;"|
!style="width:40px;"|
!style="width:40px;"|
!style="width:40px;"|
!style="width:40px;"|
!style="width:40px;"|
!style="width:40px;"|
!style="width:70px;"|
|-
|Premier Division

|-
|FAI Cup

|-
|EA Sports Cup

|-
|Leinster Senior Cup* (withdrew)

|-
|Scottish Challenge Cup

|-
!Total

League of Ireland

League table

Results summary

Results by matchday

Matches

FAI Cup

EA Sports Cup

Leinster Senior Cup

Scottish Challenge Cup

Friendlies

Pre-season

Mid-season

International call-ups

Republic of Ireland under-17

Republic of Ireland under-19

Albania under-20

Republic of Ireland under-21

Republic of Ireland national team

Awards

References 

Bohemian F.C. seasons
Bohemian F.C.